Jivia District is one of seven districts of Lauricocha Province in Peru.

See also 
 Lawriqucha River

References